Pivovarov (from пивовар meaning brewer) is a Russian masculine surname, its feminine counterpart is Pivovarova. It may refer to:
Alexey Pivovarov (born 1974), Russian journalist 
Anastasia Pivovarova (born 1990), Russian tennis player 
Olga Pivovarova (born 1956), Soviet rower
Polina Pivovarova, Belarusian racing cyclist
Sasha Pivovarova (born 1985), Russian model and actress 
Viktor Pivovarov (born 1937), Russian artist

Russian-language surnames